This is a List of NC State Wolfpack football players in the NFL Draft.

Key

Selections

Notes
Vaughan Johnson was drafted in the 1984 NFL Supplemental Draft.

Nick Mccloud went undrafted and signed with the Bills in 2021

References

North Carolina State

NC State Wolfpack NFL Draft